Fudam Bird Sanctuary is bird sanctuary location on Diu Island of the Indian Union Territory of Dadra and Nagar Haveli and Daman and Diu.

This site is a marshland and thus home to migratory birds like Flamingos, locally called as 'Surkhaab'. Other birds found in the area include the Painted Stork, Paddy field Pipit, Purple Sun Bird, Cattle Egret, Grey Plover, Clamorous Reed Warbler, Striated Heron, Red Neck Phalarope, Red Wattled Lapwing, Indian Carmorant, Red-vented Bulbul, Comb Duck, House Crow, Black Winged Stilt, Asian Palm Swift and Sanderling.

The site has an observatory tower from where birdwatchers can site the entire wetland. Near a forest office is also located.

References

External links

 

Bird sanctuaries of India
Tourist attractions in Diu district